The Poland Billie Jean King Cup team represents Poland in the Billie Jean King Cup tennis competition and are governed by the Polski Związek Tenisowy. They currently compete in the World Group.

The Radwańska sisters won three singles competitions, Katarzyna Piter and Alicja Rosolska won double match and they gave Poland return to World Group II for the first time since 2010 with a 4-1 victory over Belgium in the Fed Cup by BNP Paribas World Group II play-off.

Current Team (2022)
 Magda Linette 
 Iga Świątek 
 Alicja Rosolska 
 Magdalena Frech
 Maja Chwalińska

History
Poland competed in its first Fed Cup in 1966.  Their best result was reaching the quarterfinals in 1992 and 2015.

Billie Jean King Cup teams
Fed Cup
Fed Cup